In the United States the National Collegiate Athletic Association (NCAA), has since the 1970s been patrolling the usage of illegal drugs and substances for student-athletes attending universities and colleges. In 1999, NCAA Drug Committee published a list containing substances banned for the usage to student-athletes. Year after year it is updated and given to those students participating in college sports. If any student is caught taking any of the substances, they are subjected to suspension or even banned from participating in NCAA sports and possibly attending the university.

The list is arranged into eight classes of drugs featuring examples of each drug (Note: There is no complete list of banned drug examples).

Stimulants
Stimulant is defined as an agent (as a drug) that temporarily increases the activity of an organism or any of its part. For athletes, stimulants are used for two major reasons: to heighten energy levels and to boast endurance. (Santella 59) Examples of stimulants are: amphetamine (Adderall), caffeine (guarana), cocaine, ephedrine, fenfluramine (Fen), methamphetamine, methylphenidate (Ritalin), phentermine (Phen), synephrine (bitter orange). Stimulants phenylephrine and pseudoephedrine aren't banned. The most common abused stimulant by athletes is amphetamine.

Amphetamine
Amphetamines are the largest group of stimulants. Amphetamine was first used in the 1930s as a drug to treat various medical conditions such as narcolepsy and depression. However, during World War II, amphetamine was given to soldiers to keep them awake and alert. Soon, it leads to athletes abusing it to gain an advance. Usage of stimulants, such as amphetamine, can lead to death. In 1960, Danish cyclist Kurt Enemar Jensen died from amphetamine use during the Summer Olympics, and British cyclist Tommy Simpson died during the 1967 Tour de France with alcohol and amphetamines in his system. Amphetamines manipulate the levels of certain neurotransmitters in the central nervous system (CNS) and the peripheral nervous system (PNS).

Side effects
Several side effects from abusing stimulants are insomnia, nervousness, agitation, psychosis, and if taken in high doses, hyperthermia, heat failure, and possibly death.

Anabolic agents
Anabolic agents, or Anabolic Androgenic Steroids (AAS), are any of a group of synthetic or natural steroid hormones that builds muscle by mimicking or increasing male-producing characteristics, such as testosterones. Anabolic agents are abused by athletes in training to increase the size and strength of their muscles. However, the muscle growth only occurs when combined with rigorous physical training. Examples of anabolic agents are boldenone, clenbuterol, dehydrocholormethyl-testosterone (DHEA), nandrolone, stanozolol, testosterone, methasterone, androstenedione, norandrostenedione, methandienone, etiocholanolone, and trenbolone.

Boldenone
Boldenone is an injectable anabolic steroid. It is only available legally at a veterinarian clinic, mostly for the treatment for horses. A popular brand for boldenone is Equipoise.

Side effects
Side effects with anabolic agents are very serious and are not to be ignored. Side effects include: acne, nervous tension, aggressiveness, cramping, headaches, dizziness, high blood pressure, testicular or scrotal pain, premature male baldness, deepening in voice, jaundice, and liver damage.

Alcohol and beta blockers
Alcohol, more precisely ethanol, is a colorless flammable liquid that is the intoxicating agent in fermented and distilled liquors. Beta blockers are any of a group of drugs that decrease the rate and force of heart contractions and lower high blood pressure. Beta blockers help athletes in sports such as rifle shooting or archery where nervousness can harm performance. Examples beta blockers are atenolol, metoprolol, nadolol, pindolol, propranolol, and timolol.

Metoprolol
Metoprolol is used to treat angina (chest pain) and hypertension. It is also used to treat or prevent heart attack. Brand names for beta blockers include Lopressor and Toprol-XL.

Side effects
Side effects of alcohol and beta blockers are dizziness, depression, diarrhea, rash, slow heartbeat, and/or impotence or loss of sexual drive...

Diuretics and masking agents
Diuretics, sometimes known as ‘water pills’, are drugs which draw excess fluid from the tissues of the body and convert it into urine. They are used for the swelling and bloating of premenstrual syndrome, for treating high blood pressure and, in older people, for heart failure caused by weakening of the heart's pumping mechanism. Diuretics are used to pass drug test because they increase the amount of urine produced by the body. By increasing the amount of urine, it dilutes any drugs in the urine, which makes it harder to identify drugs. Examples of diuretics and masking agents are: bumetanide, chlorothiazide, furosemide, hydrochlorothiazide, probenecid, spironolactone (canrenone), triameterene, and trichlormethiazide.

Bumetanide
Bumetanide is a loop diuretic (water pill) that prevents your body from absorbing too much salt, allowing the salt to instead be passed in your urine. It is used to treat fluid retention (edema) in people with congestive heart failure, liver disease, or a kidney disorder such as nephritic syndrome. A brand name for bumetanide is Bumex.

Side effects
Several side effects with diuretics and masking agents are: dizziness, dehydration, heat failure, and kidney failure.

Street Drugs
Street drugs are commonly abused drugs that are bought illegally in some places and legally in many others, and have many nicknames. Examples of street drugs are heroin, marijuana and its psychoactive ingredient of tetrahydrocannabinol (THC), and cocaine.

Marijuana
Marijuana, also known as cannabis, is a euphoriant and hallucinogenic drug prepared from the dried leaves of the strong-smelling plant Cannabis sativa. Marijuana is a commonly used drug, legal in many states.

Side effects
Side effects for street drugs vary. Yet side effects for marijuana are: psychological dependence requiring more of the drug to get the same effect, sleepiness, difficulty keeping track of time, impaired or reduced short-term memory, reduced ability to perform tasks requiring concentration and coordination,
such as driving a car, increased heart rate, potential cardiac dangers for those with preexisting heart disease, bloodshot eyes, dry mouth and throat, decreased social inhibitions, paranoia, hallucinations, impaired or reduced short-term memory, impaired or reduced comprehension, altered motivation and cognition, making the acquisition of new information difficult, psychological dependence, impairments in learning and memory, perception, and judgment, anxiety or panic attacks.

Peptide hormones and analogues
Peptide hormones are water-soluble hormones composed of a few amino acids that introduce a series of chemical reactions to change the cell's metabolism. Examples of peptide hormones and analogues are: human growth hormone (hGH), human chorionic gonadotropin (hCG), and erythropoietin (EPO).

Human growth hormone (hGH)
Human growth hormone is a naturally occurring hormone that is responsible for general body growth in both men and women. hGH helps the body protein while breaking down fat deposits. Too much hGH results in increased muscle mass. (Santella 45)

Side effects
Side effects for peptide hormones and analogues are acromegaly (overgrowth of hands, feet, and some facial features), enlarged organs, and cardiovascular problems.

Anti-estrogens
Anti-Estrogens are substances that block the effects of estrogen in the body (usually to prevent tumors) and are used by athletes to counter the side effects of steroids. Anti-estrogens are clinically used in the treatment of breast cancer and to reduce the breast cancer incidence in high-risk women. Examples of anti-estrogens are: anastrozole, clomiphene, tamoxifen, and formestane.

Anastrozole
Anastrozole, brand name Arimidex, is a type of anti-estrogen used in treatment of breast cancer but is also used by bodybuilders to combat the estrogenic side effects associated with using anabolic steroids.

Side effects
Side effects for anti-estrogens are :anxiety, back, bone, breast, joint, or pelvic pain, constipation, cough, diarrhea, dizziness, flu-like symptoms, (e.g., muscle aches, tiredness), headache, hot flashes, loss of appetite, nausea, sore throat, stomach pain or upset, sweating, tingling or burning sensation, trouble sleeping, vaginal dryness, vomiting, weakness, weight gain.

Beta-2 agonists
Beta-2 agonist is a drug that opens the bronchial airways and often helps build muscle. Agonist is often referred to as a drug that stimulates natural processes in the body and beta-2 to a cell receptor. They are clinically used to help asthma patients. Yet, the abuse of beta-3 agonists can be used as an enhancer. Examples of beta-2 agonists are: bambuterol, formoterol, salbutamol, and salmeterol.

Bambuterol
Bambuterol or Bambec is used in the control of breathing problems such as asthma, and especially nocturnal asthma.

Side effects
Side effects for beta-2 agonists are: muscle cramps, rapid heartbeats, nausea, headaches, and dizziness.

References

 https://www.ncaa.org/sites/default/files/2016_17_%20Banned_%20Drugs_%20Educational_%20Document_20160531.pdf
 Pampel, Fred Library In a Book: Drugs and Sports. Facts on File, 2007. Print
 Santella, Thomas Drugs: The Straight Facts: Body Enhancement Products. Chelsea House, 2005. Print

Banned substances
Drugs in sport in the United States